James Chinlund (born March 17, 1971) is an American production designer. He was born and raised in New York City and studied Fine Art at CalArts in Los Angeles, with a focus on sculpture and large scale installation art works. After graduating, Chinlund returned to New York and started his career in film, first as a carpenter, before finding opportunities as a Production Designer on music videos and independent films. During this period he first worked with frequent collaborator Darren Aronofsky (Requiem for a Dream, The Fountain) in addition to other directors in the New York independent film world including: Todd Solondz (Storytelling), Paul Schrader (Auto Focus) and Spike Lee (25th Hour). After a short break from features to help care for his young daughter, Chinlund returned to the feature world in 2012 to work on The Avengers for Marvel which set a record for the highest grossing opening weekend ever. Since then he has been nominated six times for Art Director's Guild Awards. Two for his work on the Fox films Dawn of the Planet of the Apes and War for the Planet of the Apes directed by Matt Reeves, and most recently for his work on The Lion King directed by Jon Favreau which was the first feature film ever shot entirely in Virtual Reality. Over the years James has been active in the commercial and fashion worlds as well. Collaborators include: Inez van Lamsweerde and Vinoodh Matadin, Rupert Sanders, Spike Jonze, Marc Forster, Lance Acord, Gus Van Sant and Harmony Korine. James is currently an production designer on The Batman directed by Matt Reeves, which was released on March 4, 2022.

Awards
2009 Art Directors Guild Award for Excellence in Production Design for a commercial or music video
2010 AICP Honors for Visual Style

Filmography
 Saturn (1999)
 Requiem for a Dream (2000)
 Lift (2001)
 Storytelling (2001)
 Auto Focus (2002)
 25th Hour (2002)
 The Final Cut (2004)
 The Fountain (2006)
 Towelhead (2007)
 The Avengers (2012)
 Dawn of the Planet of the Apes (2014)
 War for the Planet of the Apes (2017)
 The Lion King (2019)
 The Batman (2022)

Press
Avengers deconstructed: Helicarrier, Stark Tower design secrets - LA Times May 24, 2012
Designing The Avengers: The Art of Marvel's Most Ambitious Movie - io9 May 2, 2012
Brand new Avengers concept art takes us inside S.H.I.E.L.D.'s hardware! - io9 January 7, 2013
Production designer James Chinlund illuminates Puma "Lift" - Boards Magazine March 24, 2009
This Is How You Design the Avengers' Helicarrier - IGN May 24, 2012
Film Decor: The Avengers
Art Directors Guild Magazine

External links

 
The Magnet Agency | James Chinlund Portfolio

Sources
Art Directors Guild Magazine
 
James Chinlund | Movies and Biography
Production Designer: videos featuring James Chinlund

1971 births
American production designers
Living people
Artists from New York City